Illegal immigration in Chile is a phenomenon that largely began in the 1990s as a result of economic growth and political stability in Chile. Most immigrants are South American, with the largest wave being Peruvian, although there has also been a significant amount of migration from the Caribbean. Illegal immigration is primarily caused by a lack of security or economic opportunities in the country of origin.

Causes 
Chile saw the restoration and restructuring of its democracy in 1990, following the end of Pinochet’s two-decade-long dictatorship. The stability of the new government led by Patricio Aylwin and a growing economy made Chile an attractive destination for immigrants. Up to the present day, Chile has continued to keep its 1975 immigration policy, while Argentina, Japan, and the United States have been tightening immigration control, therefore diverting some migration to Chile.

Much of the illegal immigration to Chile has been South American, with a large percentage coming from Peru. In 1998, there were an estimated 40,000 illegal immigrants from Peru in Chile, compared with 4,000 Bolivians, 3,000 Argentines and 2,000 Salvadorans, although today the numbers have shifted as Bolivian migration has increased. Immigration typically results from economic and/or political instability in the home country.

Peruvian immigration 
A large number of immigrants to Chile in general have been Peruvian. The proximity of the two countries lowers travel costs and enables immigrants to maintain ties with family members in Peru. The common language also encourages migration to Chile, rather than to the United States or Japan.

Many Peruvian immigrants of the 1990s are the second or third generation descendants of indigenous peoples who moved from the countryside to Peru’s urban centers during the agricultural crisis of the 1960s. Throughout the decade of the nineties, the Peruvian government under Alberto Fujimori saw an increase in poverty, with 54% of Peru’s population below the poverty line. During the period of 1980-1993, terrorist violence in the country had also resulted in about half a million displaced persons.

Bolivian immigration 
During 2015, Bolivia had a higher percentage of emigration (50.8%) than immigration. It is estimated that about 60% of Bolivian immigration to Chile is done illegally, and the driving factors are largely economic. In 2011, Bolivia was reported to have a national poverty level above 50%, with 26.1% of the population in extreme poverty. In the 2010 Human Development Report, Bolivia had the lowest score of the South American countries due to a high rural population and a significant income gap.

Colombian immigration 
see also (in Spanish): Inmigración colombiana en Chile

Much of Colombian immigration stems from Valle del Cauca, propelled by the poverty in the region and the damage caused there by the Colombian conflict.

Haitian and Dominican immigration 
see also (in Spanish): Inmigración dominicana en Chile and Inmigración haitiana en Chile

As a result of economic and political instability in Haiti, worsened by the 2010 earthquake, visas for indefinite residency in Chile for Haitians increased by 76% from 2005 to 2015, signaling a larger immigration trend that includes illegal immigration. The socioeconomic vulnerability of Haitians have made them a target for human trafficking, with routes that end in Chile.

Similarly, migration from the Dominic Republic has resulted from economic pressures in the home country. Of about 15,000 Dominican immigrants to Chile in 2016, it has been estimated that only about a third arrived legally. Illegal crossings have increased after a new restriction on Dominican immigration introduced in 2012, which states that Dominican citizens must obtain a tourist visa in order to travel to Chile. The visa requires proof of a stable economic situation in the home country and of a host in Chile.

Process

Crossing the border 

Many undocumented immigrants from Peru are recruited by employers in Chile to serve as a source of cheap labor. They arrive in Chile identifying themselves as tourists, and once in the country they may work in poor conditions for low pay. From 1992 to 2002, labor immigration increased from 31% to 48%, accompanied by a decrease of 64% in professional and technical migration. Sex trafficking also occurs. In a report on human trafficking for 2011-2013, 85% of reported cases of sex and labor trafficking resulted from being sold by a friend or family member, and six percent resulted from internet contact.

Dominican and Haitian undocumented immigrants typically reach Chile by flying to northern South America, travelling to Lima and entering Chile by bus. Intermediaries receive money to transport the migrants. Some illegal immigrants from the Dominican Republic have been victim to scams promising to provide them valid documentation in exchange for payment, only to be charged later in Chile for undocumented entry. Some cross the Atacama desert by foot, a dangerous option due to the presence of land mines left over from the Pinochet period. The Chilean government has tried to block migration routes with walls along the border, but because of the country's long perimeter, the endeavor has proven to be expensive and ineffective.

Legal punishment 
According to the Immigration Law of 1975, undocumented immigrants can be sanctioned by migration officials in Chile. Initially, they receive a warning if they are judged to have committed the following offenses:

1)  Working illegally in the country

2)  Staying in the country past the expiration of a tourist or resident visa

3)  Following the reception of a resident visa, failing to obtain an identity card (not applicable to minors) or failing to inform the government of a change in household

Repeat offenders receive a fine. In the case of illegal workers, fines can vary from one to 50 times the “sueldo vital” (22.3% Chile’s minimum wage), and for illegal residents who fail to obtain their identity card or inform the state of a change in household, fines vary from one to 20 times the sueldo vital. Transportation companies illegally bringing undocumented workers into Chile can be fined 1-20 times the sueldo vital for each person carried, and fines vary from 1-40 times the sueldo vital per person hired, charged against those who hired the illegal workers. Owners, administrators or managers of hotels, residences or houses providing lodging to illegal immigrants can also be charged 1-20 sueldos vitales per person.

Legalization 
The visa with which many immigrants enter the country illegally, the tourist visa, expires after 90 days.

In 2015, a new visa was released by the foreign affairs department of Chile. Previously, the Visa Sujeta a Contrato had been the only labor visa in place. The Visa Sujeta a Contrato requires a signed labor contract to gain temporary residency, which expires on the end date of the contract. Subject to the conditions of the visa, employers must pay for the migrant’s transportation back to their home country. The Visa por Motivos Laborales, in place since February 15, also requires a labor contract, but it is not necessary for the employer to pay the return trip to the worker’s native country, and the worker has the freedom to change employers without notifying the government. This visa lasts for a year, during which time the visa holder can apply for indefinite residence in Chile.

Those who do not have a labor contract can apply for the Visa Temporaria. This visa can be requested if: the applicant has family relations in Chile who require their assistance; is a clergyman working with a religious order in the country; is retired and plans to stay in Chile for more than 90 days; is working on a business project; has professional obligations; or gives birth in Chile.

To obtain any visa, Peruvians, Dominicans and Colombians are also required to present documentation of their criminal history. The price of a visa depends on its type and on the nationality of the applicant.

The MERCOSUR visa, following an agreement among Bolivia, Argentina, Brazil, Paraguay, Uruguay and Chile, enables nationals of those countries to reside in Chile for a year without any requirement except for a valid passport and a non-criminal history.

Living conditions of undocumented immigrants 
According to analysis of a CASEN survey in 2006, undocumented immigrants to Chile live in more deprived socioeconomic conditions than legal immigrants and tend to have poorer health outcomes, although a large proportion of immigrants in general do not have health insurance. For the illegal immigrant, this is a result of lacking work papers.

Housing 
Housing options for Peruvian migrants are limited due to a lack of financial resources, paperwork and, in some cases, due to ethnic discrimination. According to a survey conducted in Santiago in 2003, in which 20% of participants were of undocumented status, urban immigrants usually live in collective housing, with about 3.2 permanent residents per room. The rooms measure, on average, 12 square meters, and they serve as a space to sleep, cook, eat and socialize. Most of the migrants in the study owned a stove and a television, but only a few owned a refrigerator or washing machine. Housing may not include heating.

In Antofagasta, there is a large and rapidly growing immigrant population, of whom about 15% are without documentation. The region is prone to landslides, such as one that occurred in 1991 and left 92 dead. In these communities, residents construct their own houses with wood sold by vendors in the area. They improvise power installations by hanging cords from wooden poles. Water arrives by truck once a week.

Education 
With the increase in immigrant population, the Chilean government has enlarged subsidies to regions of the country with large immigrant communities. One measure that has resulted is a program for basic education. In Santiago, over one thousand illegal immigrants were registered as students in this program in the course of a year. Karen Rojo, mayor of Antofagasta since 2012, has claimed that the Antofagastan government offers public education to all children, including those who are in the country illegally. However, many illegal immigrants leave their children in the home country. Undocumented immigrants are focused on gaining money to subsist on or to send back home, and education is not a main concern.

Results

Political responses in Chile

Pro-immigration 
The former president of Chile, Michelle Bachelet, has supported greater equality for immigrants, noting their economic and cultural contributions to the country. In January 2017, Bachelet proposed legislation to replace the 1975 Immigration Law, which would secure the rights of undocumented immigrants to health, education, social security and labor justice. The law would also loosen entry restrictions and decriminalize undocumented immigration, enabling immigrants to appeal against expulsion. Based on the 1975 law, deportation is currently decided by the Ministry of the Interior and Public Security. Bachelet's proposal was not accepted during the January 2017 session, keeping the 1975 law in place.

To date, the Party for Democracy is the only Chilean political party with a Secretary of Migration and Refugees. The party is in favor of loosening visa restrictions, and has challenged stigmas against immigrants, promoting "interculturality."

Anti-immigration 
Former president Sebastián Piñera introduced a proposal to replace the 1975 immigration law during his presidency. The legislation would tighten restrictions on entry and facilitate expulsion, but it was not approved by Congress.

Members of the party Chile Vamos have been particularly pushing for a more restrictive immigration policy. The party has  created a commission to increase immigration control, mostly targeting immigrants with a criminal history. Congressmen of the National Renewal and the Independent Democratic Union parties have also proposed a tougher immigration law. At the end of 2016, Piñera voiced support for the proposed law, accusing illegal immigrants for an increase in crime rates. Other anti-immigration supporters have brought up increased public spending and unemployment as motivations for stricter legislation, emphasizing the challenges already faced by the Chilean-born poor. Waldo Mora, intendente of Antofagasta from 2013 to 2014, has accused illegal immigrants of spreading HIV and tuberculosis in the region.

Public reactions 
Chilean attitudes towards Peruvian immigration are mixed. The majority appear to be concerned not with racial or nationalistic issues, but with the potentially economic effects on Chileans. In a survey of the Chilean public, 55.6% of participants disagreed with the statement that “if Peruvians get too mixed with Chileans, the quality of our people will worsen.” Likewise, 56.2% disagreed that “Peruvian immigrants that come to our country are more likely to commit crimes.” However, 69.4% agreed that “although Peruvians need employment, Chilean entrepreneurs should always prefer Chileans.”

Pro-migrant organizations and actions 
Religious groups in Chile have been promoting the integration of migrants. The Instituto Católico Chileno de Migración (INCAMI) has offices throughout the country and works specifically to obtain documentation for immigrants of illegal status. INCAMI also helps provide housing and health care, eases assimilation, and spreads awareness. The Servicio Jesuita a Migrantes (SJM) also works to integrate migrants, offering Spanish courses for Haitians and providing other educational, social, and judicial support, as well as resources for those who seek employment. SJM has introduced an "Infancia sin Condiciones" ("Unconditional Childhood") campaign, which offers child immigrants the opportunity to spend a summer studying for free in Valaparaíso. The program's curriculum includes discussions of race, discrimination, and immigration, and children of any migratory status are eligible.

In 2014, undocumented immigrants marched for legalization in Santiago. In January 2017, there was another march in the capital organized by the Coordinadora Nacional de Immigrantes.

Anti-migrant sentiment 
The right wing movement Acción Identitaria, concerned with maintaining national identity, values, and security, has condemned the potential cultural and physical dangers of immigration into Chile.

In Antofagasta, a high immigrant population has produced tensions between immigrants and native Chileans, particularly due to the association of illegal immigrants with biological disease and drug trafficking. These tensions were in expressed in October 2013, following a Colombian defeat against Chile in a match leading up to the 2014 FIFA World Cup. Colombian celebrations in the street led to verbal confrontations with Chileans that lasted throughout the night. A week later, Chileans staged a march under the slogan "Recuperemos Antofagasta" ("Take Back Antofagasta"). The private group Antofa Segura has continued the campaign against illegal immigrants in Antofagasta, with the goal of reducing delinquency in the region. However, anti-immigrant sentiment is not universal in the region. In the 2016 elections, Karen Rojo (Independent) defeated the mayoral candidate of the anti-immigrant party Chile Vamos by a 3% margin. Rojo has manifested support for the immigrant population, providing public services for those of undetermined status. In response to the unrest in 2013, Rojo arranged a "multicultural board" to discuss issues of discrimination in the region. The board is composed of the Office of the Public Defender (Defensoría Penal Pública), the Investigative Police (PDI), policemen, social organizations and municipal leaders.

References

Immigration to Chile
Chile
Law of Chile
Chile